Katie Kim may refer to:

Katie Kim (Irish musician) (born 1983), Irish musician
Katie Kim (South Korean singer) (born 1993), South Korean singer